Jane Annabelle Apsion (born 17 September 1960 in Hammersmith, London) is an English actress best known for playing Monica Gallagher in the hit television comedy-drama Shameless (2004-2013), Joy Wilton in Soldier Soldier (1991-1995), and Violet Buckle in Call the Midwife (2015-Present).

Career
Apart from Shameless, Apsion is also known for her portrayals of Betty in My Good Friend, Beverly in The Lakes, Patricia Hillman in Coronation Street, and Mrs. Beech in Michelle Magorian's Goodnight Mister Tom. She has appeared in two separate episodes of Midsomer Murders, Death in Chorus and Dead Man's 11, as two different characters. She played Jenni Hicks, whose two daughters died at the 1989 Hillsborough disaster, in the docudrama Hillsborough, which aired in 1996. She has since featured in an episode of Lewis and played a small role in the first episode of the sitcom In with the Flynns. Most recently, she appeared in the BBC series The Village alongside her Shameless co-star Maxine Peake.

In 2001, she co-starred alongside Johnny Depp, Heather Graham, and Robbie Coltrane in From Hell as Polly Nichols, the first known victim of Jack the Ripper. Other films she has appeared in include About a Boy, The War Zone, Lolita, This Year's Love, and Ironclad.

Apsion appeared intermittently on Shameless as Monica Gallagher between 2004 and 2006 before becoming a regular cast member for the show's fourth series in 2007. She left the show in 2008, with her final scenes airing in March 2009 during the sixth series. She briefly returned to the role in 2011 during the eighth series and for the eleventh and final series in 2013.

Outside of acting, she has appeared as a guest panellist on Five's The Wright Stuff during 2008 and 2009.

In 2014, Apsion portrayed Annette Walker in an episode of the detective drama Suspects, and more recently she appeared in episodes of Call the Midwife as Violet Buckle (née Gee) and in episodes of Doc Martin as Jennifer Cardew.

In 2020 Apsion played Beattie May in an episode of Father Brown.

Personal life
Apsion is a former student of Godalming College, Surrey and the University of Wales. She is also co-founder and practitioner of the Rosen Method Bodywork in the UK, an alternative health practice which integrates mind and body.

Filmography

Film

Television

Theatre

References

External links

1960 births
English film actresses
English radio actresses
English stage actresses
English television actresses
Living people
Actresses from London
20th-century English actresses
21st-century English actresses